Depatuxizumab mafodotin (INN; development code ABT-414) is an antibody-drug conjugate designed for the treatment of cancer. It is composed of an EGFR IGg1 monoclonal antibody (depatuxizumab) conjugated to the tubulin inhibitor monomethyl auristatin F via a stable maleimidocaproyl link.

This drug was developed by AbbVie. In May 2019 AbbVie stopped enrolment in all studies of Depatux-M after late-stage failure in newly diagnosed glioblastoma.

In 2014, Orphan Drug Status was granted by the FDA for glioblastoma multiforme. It is in phase II/III clinical trials for glioblastoma, in phase II clinical trials for non-small cell lung cancer, and in phase I clinical trials for the treatment of other solid tumors. Phase I results were presented at ASCO in 2016.

References 

Experimental cancer drugs
Orphan drugs
Monoclonal antibodies for tumors
Antibody-drug conjugates